Wayne Hoffman (born November 20, 1981) is an American mentalist and illusionist. He has appeared on many international television shows and tours the world with his live show entitled "Mind Candy"  and his motivational keynote entitled "The Power and Potential of The Human Mind." He also performs a virtual magic and mind reading show entitled "Distant Deceptions." He appeared on America's Got Talent, season 10 (2015)  and also appeared in their TV commercial. He appeared on NBC's television show Phenomenon on October 31, 2007. He was a co-host of The A-List on Discovery's Animal Planet.  He was also a guest on CNN's television talk show Glenn Beck on March 25, 2008. He appeared as a guest on The Ellen Degeneres Show on April 13, 2009. On May 4, 2012, he appeared in a short movie entitled "Epic School Battle" with Steven Tyler and KISS He also appeared on CBS's Excused on October 30, 2012. He also appeared on Beverly Hills Pawn on June 12, 2013. Wayne Hoffman was also an expert guest on The Numbers Game on The National geographic Channel on March 31, 2014  Wayne successfully fooled Penn & Teller on their show Fool Us on the CW network on August 31, 2016. He subsequently performed onstage with Penn & Teller at the Rio Hotel and casino on September 25, 2016. Wayne also appeared on the show HARRY, hosted by Harry Connick Jr., on October 13, 2017. He also appeared on Takeshi Kitano's "Unbelieveable" on Japan's TV Asahi in December 2013. He was also a guest on Fuji TV's "Anbiribabo" on March 20, 2014

Early life

Wayne Nicholas Hoffman was born in Reading, Pennsylvania. He graduated from Holy Name High School

His father is Frederick Hoffman  (born 1936), and his mother is Rose Schober (born 1948). In 1991 Hoffman discovered the Mingus Magic Shop in Reading, Pa and it was there he discovered his passion for the mystery arts. Wayne Hoffman spent his early life visiting the Mingus Magic shop where he studied magic and mentalism. He performed his first paid show at the age of 15 in Reading, Pennsylvania. After graduating from high school he attended Alvernia College (now Alvernia University). Hoffman's childhood interest in magic and mind reading led him to study psychology. He eventually became a professional magician and began performing regionally and then internationally. He is a member of the International Brotherhood of Magicians and a member of the Academy of Magical Arts which opersates The Magic Castle in Hollywood, California.

Career
Hoffman initially focused on traditional magic and illusion before turning his focus to mentalism and psychological entertainment. He performed for various events in the eastern half of the United States before his international success. In the beginning of his career, he performed table-to-table at restaurants in his home town. but he soon began experimenting with mentalism. Throughout high school he would perform for classmates and workers at the school. Later Hoffman began performing for corporations who would pay him to incorporate their sales message into his magic.

Hoffman quickly began performing throughout the United States.  In 2003 he began touring the United States as part of a college & university tour. In 2006 he furthered his career by performing for Princess Cruise lines where he was nominated as Entertainer of The Year.

Hoffman's "big break" came in 2007 when he was contacted by NBC. Impressed by his mentalism act, NBC asked him to participate in their television show  Phenomenon. The producers were impressed with his apparent ability to change traffic lights with his mind. After his exposure on Phenomenon, he began to get phone calls for appearances on other television shows such as, The Glenn Beck Show, The Ellen DeGeneres Show, and more. Shortly after, Hoffman performed his first international show in England. Hoffman later became known as "The Master of Mayhem."

From 2007 onward, he performed with great success in the United States and beyond. He would appear to read minds, influence audience members' thoughts, and perform feats of psychokinesis. He focused much of his attention on death-defying stunts, which added the possibility of death.

For the majority of his career, he performed his act as a headliner. One of his most notable mentalism feats was performed on Phenomenon (TV series), where he influenced former Miss USA Shandi Finnessey to draw a yin-yang symbol which he had tattooed on his arm one month prior. In 2006 he established Hoffman Entertainment which provides talent management. The business is still in operation as of February 2021.

TV and Media Appearances
{| class="wikitable"
|-
! Year
! Show Title
! Network
! Role
! Notes
! Reference
|-
|| 2007
| Phenomenon
| NBC Universal Television
| Self
|| Multiple Episodes
| 
|-
|| 2008
| The Glenn Beck Show
| CNN
| Self
|| n/a
| 
|-
|| 2008
| The A-List
| The Discovery Network
| Self
|| Co-host
| 
|-
|| 2009
| The Ellen DeGeneres Show
| NBC Universal Television
| Self
|| n/a
| 
|-
|| 2011
| Excused
| CBS
| Self
|| n/a
| 
|-
|| 2012
| Epic School Battle
| Unknown
| Self
|| co-starring Steven Tyler and KISS
| 
|-
|| 2013
| Beverly Hills Pawn
| Reelz
| Self
|| n/a
| 
|-
|| 2013
| Oddities
| The Science Channel
| Self
|| n/a
| 
|-
|| 2013
| Unbelievable
| TV Asahi (Japan)
| Self
|| with Takeshi Kitano
| 
|-
|| 2013
| Anbiribabo
| Fuji TV (Japan)
| Self
|| n/a| 
|-
|| 2014
| The Numbers Game
| National Geographic Channel
| Self
|| n/a| 
|-
|| 2015
| America's Got Talent
| NBC Universal Television
| Self
|| Multiple Episodes| 
|-
|| 2015
| TODAY
| NBC Universal Television
| Self
|| Multiple Episodes| 
|-
|| 2016
| Now You See It
| BBC
| Self
|| n/a| 
|-
|| 2016
| Penn & Teller: Fool Us
| The CW Network
| Self
|| n/a| 
|-
|| 2016
| The Marilyn Denis Show
| Canadian Television (CTV)
| Self
|| n/a| 
|-
|| 2017
| HARRY
| NBC Universal Television
| Self
|| n/a| 
|-
|| 2017
| Magic Control (마법 제어)
| TV Chosun
| Self
|| Multiple Episodes| 
|-
|| 2018
| Pickler & Ben
| CMT
| Self
|| Multiple Episodes| 
|-
|| 2018
| The Morning Show
| Shaw Network
| Self
|| n/a| 
|-
|| 2019
| Daily Blast Live
| Syndicated
| Self
|| Multiple Episodes in 2019, 2020, and 2021| 
|-
|| 2021
| Go-Big Show
| Turner Broadcasting System (TBS)
| Self
|| n/a| 
|-
|}

In the news
On November 23, 2011, Hoffman was featured in a story for CNN Money where he was featured in their story "Cool Companies". The story highlighted 12 "cool and profitable companies." The story was written by Kitt Walsh.

On November 1, 2011, he was quoted in YFS (Young, Fabulous, and Self-employed) Magazine.

On October 5, 2012, Hoffman was featured in a story posted on the CNN Money website. The story was about the Top Ten surprising six-figure jobs. The Story was written by Blake Ellis.

On October 5, 2012, Hoffman was featured in Yahoo! Finance in a story originally posted by CNN Money about the Top 10 surprising six-figure jobs.

On October 8, 2012, Hoffman was featured on the AOL homepage in a story originally posted by CNN Money on the Top 10 surprising six-figure jobs.

Motivational presentation
In 2009, Hoffman began presenting a motivational speech entitled "The Power and Potential of The Human Mind" His first presentation was at the Rio Hotel and Casino in Las Vegas.

Mind Candy
In 2012, Hoffman wrote his first book entitled Mind Candy''. The book is a motivational book that teaches people a method to achieve any goal they have. The system taught in the book implements common sense business tactics, as well as positive thinking.

Hoffman Entertainment
In 1996, Hoffman established his entertainment agency, Hoffman Entertainment. The agency books various acts including bands, comedians, speakers, and interactive novelties. Hoffman Entertainment has three offices in the United States. The first office is located in Hollywood, California.  The second office is located in Reading, Pennsylvania. The third office is located in Estero, Florida.

Philanthropy
In 2012, Hoffman established his first charitable organization, The Hoffman Foundation.  The goal of the organization is to help children from lower-income families experience live theater.

Near death experience / flight incident
On January 30, 2008, Hoffman and his father were on an American Airlines flight from San Juan to Philadelphia. During the flight the plane's cockpit caught on fire. It was later discovered that a fuse in the window's heater blew causing an electrical fire.  The plane made an emergency landing at Palm Beach International Airport 90 minutes after the plane's cabin filled with smoke.  7 people were sent to the hospital including the captain and the co-pilot.  The co-pilot was treated for cuts he sustained to his face when the plane's windshield shattered.

Awards and nominations

References

External links
 Official website
 

1981 births
Living people
Alvernia University alumni
Mentalists